Jeffrey Hunter was an actor.

Jeffrey Hunter may also refer to:
Jeff Hunter (politician), Australian politician
Jeff Hunter (American football) (born 1966), American football player

See also
Geoffrey Hunter (disambiguation)